The Toboggan Stakes, formerly the Toboggan Handicap, is an American Thoroughbred horse race run annually during the first week of March at Aqueduct Race Track in Queens, New York. Open to horses aged three and older, the Grade III event is contested over at a distance of six furlongs on the dirt and offers a purse of $150,000 added.

The 123rd running of The Toboggan Handicap was run in 2016. Before 1896, it was called the Toboggan Slide because it took place on the downhill Eclipse course at Morris Park Racecourse in the Bronx. The Toboggan Slide was not run in 1891 or 1895.  The Toboggan Handicap was not run in 1911 and 1912.

In 2015, it was run in early February.

Since inception, the Toboggan Stakes has been contested at two different distances:
 6 furlongs: 1890–1993, 2005–present
 7 furlongs: 1995–2004,2018

Records
Speed record: (at current distance of 6 furlongs)
 1:08.40 – Nance's Lad (1956)

Most wins:
 2 – Octagon (1897, 1898)
 2 – Banastar (1899, 1901)
 2 – High Noon (1915, 1916)
 2 – Osmand (1928, 1929)
 2 – Okapi (1933, 1934)
 2 – Eight Thirty (1940, 1941)
 2 – Devil Diver (1943, 1944)
 2 – Rippey (1948, 1949)
 2 – Boom Towner (1992, 1995)
 2 – Affirmed Success (2002, 2003)
 2 – Calibrachoa (2011, 2012)

Most wins by a jockey:
 6 – Richard Migliore (1985, 1997, 1999, 2002, 2003, 2006)

Most wins by a trainer:
 4 – James G. Rowe Sr. (1890, 1900, 1913, 1922)
 4 – John J. Hyland (1896, 1897, 1898, 1903)
 4 – H. Allen Jerkens (1957, 1963, 1969, 1970)

Most wins by an owner:
 5 – August Belmont Jr. and/or Blemton Stable (1896, 1897, 1898, 1903, 1914)

Winners of the Toboggan Stakes

* † In 1961, Chief of Chiefs finished first, but was disqualified.

References

Graded stakes races in the United States
Grade 3 stakes races in the United States
Horse races in New York City
Open sprint category horse races
Recurring sporting events established in 1890
Aqueduct Racetrack
Morris Park Racecourse
1890 establishments in New York (state)